Paul John Guloien  (born December 2, 1941) is a Canadian jazz saxophonist. He has won one Juno award as a solo artist, and one for his work with the Rob McConnell Tentet.

Early life
Perry was born to saxophonist Paul Guloien, who performed under the name Paul Perry, and Margaret Yeo. Early in life they moved around Canada between Medicine Hat, Regina, Sylvan Lake and Vancouver. He learned to play the clarinet and piano before becoming a saxophonist for his father's band when he was 14. Perry has spent most of his time in Canada.

Career
As a young man, Perry played at Sylvan Lake and in various Vancouver night clubs.

Perry's album Time Flies was recorded in 2003 and 2004, and released  on the Justin Time label in 2005.

Awards and honours
 Juno Award for Best Jazz Album, 1993
 Best Alto Saxophone,  Critics' Choice, Jazz Report magazine, 1993–1997
 Best Large Jazz Ensemble Album, Juno Award, with Rob McConnell Tentet, 2001
 Saxophonist of the Year, National Jazz Awards Canada, 2003
 Lifetime Achievement Award, City of Edmonton, 2005
 Honorary Diploma in Music, Grant MacEwan College, Edmonton, 1996
 Honorary doctorate of law, University of Alberta, 2007
 Order of Canada with grade of member, 2016

Discography
 My Ideal (Unity, 1989)
 Worth Waiting For (Jazz Alliance, 1990 )
 With the Edmonton Symphony Orchestra (Justin Time, 2000 )
 P. J. Perry Quintet (Unity/Page, 2004)
 Time Flies (Justin Time, 2005 )
 Joined at the Hip (Cellar Live, 2007)
 Nota Bene (2009)
 Old Friends (Royalty, 2014)

References

External links
 Official site
 Interview

1941 births
Canadian jazz saxophonists
Male saxophonists
Juno Award for Best Jazz Album winners
Living people
Members of the Order of Canada
Musicians from Calgary
21st-century saxophonists
21st-century Canadian male musicians
Canadian male jazz musicians
Justin Time Records artists